Faxonius wrighti, the Hardin crayfish, is a species of crayfish in the family Cambaridae. It is endemic to the United States. The common name refers to Hardin County, Tennessee, where the original specimens were found.

References

External links

Cambaridae
Fauna of the United States
Freshwater crustaceans of North America
Crustaceans described in 1948
Taxa named by Horton H. Hobbs Jr.
Taxobox binomials not recognized by IUCN